Frans van der Mijn (1719, Dusseldorp – 1783, London), was an 18th-century painter from the Northern Netherlands.

Biography
According to the Netherlands Institute for Art History (RKD) he was the son of Herman van der Mijn and was born when his father moved to Düsseldorf to work for Johann Wilhelm, Elector Palatine. He influenced the painter James Latham. He worked in Amsterdam during the years 1742-1748 and worked in the Hague before returning to England where he worked on portraits and sent a painting in to the London Society of Artists each year during 1761-1772.

In 1750 Johan van Gool wrote about him, his father, his brothers Robert, George, Andreas and Gerard, and his sister Cornelia who were all good painters. In 1808 Edward Edwards wrote the following about him: "Frank Vandermine, or Vander Mijne: A native of Holland, who lived many years in England, and 
practised as a portrait painter, both in London and the country. He was some time at Norwich, where he painted several heads. He had considerable merit as an artist, but was of mean address and vulgar manners: He loved smoking and drinking, nor would forego his pipe, though it was offensive to his employers, so that he never acquired the practice which he might otherwise have obtained. He boasted, that after he had painted a portrait, the likeness remained so strong upon his memory, that if the picture were immediately obliterated, he could repaint the resemblance without the assistance of the sitter. He died in indigent circumstances, at his apartments in Moorfields, some time in 1783.

Other painters
Beside Frank, there were two other artists of the same name, R. and A. Vandermine, both of whom were related to the former. One of them painted for the shops, and there are many slight pictures of an Old Man, in a loose coat and hair cap, 
hugging a bag of money, which were painted, by one of these artists. The wife of one of them was also of the profession: 
She painted fruit and flowers, and they were all exhibitors at the Society's Rooms in the Strand, in the years 1761 and 1762. 
There is a mezzotinto portrait of Frank, from a picture of his own painting, inscribed, The Smoker. It represents himself in profile, with a pipe in his mouth."

References

External links

Frans van der Mijn on Artnet

1719 births
1783 deaths
18th-century Dutch painters
18th-century Dutch male artists
Dutch male painters
Artists from Düsseldorf